Judge Levin may refer to:

Gerald Sanford Levin (1906–1971), judge of the United States District Court for the Northern District of California
Theodore Levin (1897–1970), judge of the United States District Court for the Eastern District of Michigan

See also
Max S. Levine (1881–1933), judge of the Court of Special Sessions of New York
Justice Levine (disambiguation)